An imagined community is a concept developed by Benedict Anderson in his 1983 book Imagined Communities to analyze nationalism. Anderson depicts a nation as a socially-constructed community, imagined by the people who perceive themselves as part of a group.

Anderson focuses on the way media creates imagined communities, especially the power of print media in shaping an individual's social psyche. Anderson analyzes the written word, a tool used by churches, authors, and media companies (notably books, newspapers, and magazines), as well as governmental tools such as the map, the census, and the museum. These tools were all built to target and define a mass audience in the public sphere through dominant images, ideologies, and language. Anderson explores the racist and colonial origins of these practices before explaining a general theory that explains how contemporary governments and corporations can (and frequently do) utilize these same practices. These theories were not originally applied to the Internet or television.

Origin
According to Anderson, the creation of imagined communities has become possible because of "print capitalism". Capitalist entrepreneurs printed their books and media in the vernacular (instead of exclusive script languages, such as Latin) in order to maximize circulation. As a result, readers speaking various local dialects became able to understand each other, and a common discourse emerged. Anderson argued that the first European nation states were thus formed around their "national print-languages."
Anderson argues that the first form of capitalism started with the process of printing books and religious materials. The process of printing texts in the vernacular started right after books began to be printed in script languages, such as Latin, which saturated the elite market. At the moment it was also observed that just a small category of people was speaking it and was part of the bilingual society. The start of cultural and national revolution was around 1517 when Martin Luther presented his views regarding the scripture, that people should be able to read it in their own homes. In the following years, from 1520 to 1540, more than half of the books printed in German translation bore his name. 
Moreover, the first European nation states that are presented as having formed around their "national print-languages" are said to be found in the Anglo-Saxon region, nowadays England, and around today's Germany. Not only in Western Europe was the process of creating a nation emerging. In a few centuries, most European nations had created their own national languages but still were using languages such as Latin, French or German (primarily French and German) for political affair.

Nationalism and imagined communities
According to Anderson's theory of imagined communities, the main causes of nationalism are  the movement to abolish the ideas of rule by divine right and hereditary monarchy; and the emergence of printing press capitalism ("the convergence of capitalism and print technology... standardization of national calendars, clocks and language was embodied in books and the publication of daily newspapers")—all phenomena occurring with the start of the Industrial Revolution. 
From this, Anderson argues that in the presence and development of technology, people started to make differences between what means divine and divinity and what really is history and politics because initially, the divine and the history of society and politics were based on the existence of a common religion that was a unification umbrella for all the people across Europe. With the emergence of the printing press and capitalism, people gained national consciousness regarding the common values that bring those people together. The Imagined Communities started with the creation of their own nation print-languages that each individual spoke.  That helped develop the first forms of known nation-states, who then created their own form of art, novels, publications, mass media, and communications.

While attempting to define nationalism, Anderson identifies three paradoxes:

"(1) The objective modernity of nations to the historians' eyes vs. their subjective antiquity in the eyes of nationalists. (2) The formal universality of nationality as a socio-cultural concept [...] vs. the irremediable particularity of its concrete manifestations [and] (3) the 'political power of such nationalisms vs. their philosophical poverty and even incoherence."

Anderson talks of Unknown Soldier tombs as an example of nationalism. The tombs of Unknown Soldiers are either empty or hold unidentified remains, but each nation with these kinds of memorials claims these soldiers as their own. No matter what the actual origin of the Unknown Soldier is, these nations have placed them within their imagined community.

Nation as an imagined community
He defined a nation as "an imagined political community." As Anderson puts it, a nation "is imagined because the members of even the smallest nation will never know most of their fellow-members, meet them, or even hear of them, yet in the minds of each lives the image of their communion." Members of the community probably will never know each of the other members face to face; however, they may have similar interests or identify as part of the same nation. Members hold in their minds a mental image of their affinity. For example, the nationhood felt with other members of your nation when your "imagined community" participates in a larger event such as the Olympic Games.

Finally, a nation is a community because,

Context and influence
Benedict Anderson arrived at his theory because he felt neither Marxist nor liberal theory adequately explained nationalism.

Anderson falls into the "historicist" or "modernist" school of nationalism along with Ernest Gellner and Eric Hobsbawm in that he posits that nations and nationalism are products of modernity and have been created as means to political and economic ends. This school opposes the primordialists, who believe that nations, if not nationalism, have existed since early human history. Imagined communities can be seen as a form of social constructionism on par with Edward Said's concept of imagined geographies.

In contrast to Gellner and Hobsbawm, Anderson is not hostile to the idea of nationalism, nor does he think that nationalism is obsolete in a globalizing world. Anderson values the utopian element in nationalism.

According to Harald Bauder, the concept of imagined communities remains highly relevant in a contemporary context of how nation-states frame and formulate their identities about domestic and foreign policy, such as policies towards immigrants and migration. According to Euan Hague, "Anderson's concept of nations being 'imagined communities' has become standard within books reviewing geographical thought".

Even though the term was coined to specifically describe nationalism, it is now used more broadly, almost blurring it with community of interest. For instance, it can be used to refer to a community based on sexual orientation, or awareness of global risk factors.

The term has been influential on other thinkers. British anthropologist Mark Lindley-Highfield of Ballumbie Castle describes ideas such as "the West", which are given agentive status as though they are homogeneous real things, as entity-concepts, where these entity-concepts can have different symbolic values attributed to them to those attributed to the individuals comprising the group, who on an individual basis might be perceived differently. Lindley-Highfield explains: "Thus the discourse flows at two levels: One at which ideological disembodied concepts are seen to compete and contest, that have an agency of their own and can have agency acted out against them; and another at which people are individuals and may be distinct from the concepts held about their broader society." This varies from Anderson’s work in that the application of the term is from the outside, and in terms of the focus on the inherent contradiction between the divergent identities of the entity-concepts and those who would fall under them.

See also 
 Invented tradition

References

Political science terminology
Political philosophy
Neologisms
Community
Sociological theories
Social constructionism